Lullwater House is the president's mansion at Emory University near Atlanta, Georgia, overlooking Candler Lake. It was built in 1926 as the residence of Walter T. Candler, son of Coca-Cola founder Asa Griggs Candler. The mansion is in the form of an L, in Tudor-Gothic revival style. The architects were Ivey and Crook.

Candler named the estate Lullwater Farms. Horses were kept for racing. Cattle grazed on the fields.

In 1958, Candler sold the house and land to Emory. In 1963, Sanford Atwood became the first president of Emory to take up residence in the mansion. Since then, Emory presidents have continued to live there when they hold that position.

The estate should not be confused with Lullwater Estate, originally called Rainbow Terrace, the mansion built for Lucy Candler Heinz, Walter Candler and Asa G. Candler, Jr.'s sister.

References
 History of Lullwater, Emory University
 "Lullwater House", Emory History Minute series (video)
 "Lullwater House and Park", Druid Hills High School
 "Ivey and Crook" , New Georgia Encyclopedia

Houses in Atlanta
Ivey and Crook buildings
Houses completed in 1926
Tudor Revival architecture in Georgia (U.S. state)
Gothic Revival architecture in Georgia (U.S. state)
Emory University
Druid Hills, Georgia
1926 establishments in Georgia (U.S. state)